The transverse facial artery is an artery that branches from the superficial temporal artery and runs across the face.

Course
The transverse facial artery is given off from the superficial temporal artery before that vessel leaves the parotid gland; running forward through the substance of the gland, it passes transversely across the side of the face, between the parotid duct and the lower border of the zygomatic arch, and divides into numerous branches, which supply the parotid gland and parotid duct, the masseter muscle, and the integument, and anastomose with the facial artery, the masseteric artery, the buccinator artery, and the infraorbital artery.

This vessel rests on the masseter, and is accompanied by one or two branches of the facial nerve.

Additional images

See also
 Facial artery

References

External links
  - "The Transverse Facial Artery and Vein"
 

Arteries of the head and neck
Face